Docter may refer to:

 Docter (surname)
 Docter Optics, a German manufacturer of sports optics

See also 
 Arthur Docters van Leeuwen, a Dutch politician, jurist and civil servant
 Doctor (disambiguation)